Louisa Porogovska (born 31 March 1987) is a British freestyle wrestler. She competed for England in the women's freestyle 55 kg event at the 2014 Commonwealth Games where she won a bronze medal.

Filmography 
Dangal (2016) - Played Fictional Character - Wrestler "Angelina Watson"

References

External links

1987 births
Living people
British female sport wrestlers
Sportspeople from Preston, Lancashire
Commonwealth Games bronze medallists for England
Wrestlers at the 2014 Commonwealth Games
Commonwealth Games medallists in wrestling
20th-century British women
21st-century British women
Medallists at the 2014 Commonwealth Games